InSecurity is a Canadian spy comedy television series that aired on CBC Television from 2011 to 2012. The series centres on a team of covert operatives working for the National Intelligence and Security Agency (NISA), a fictional Canadian intelligence service. The series is set in Ottawa but filmed primarily in Regina, Saskatchewan. The initial season of 13 episodes premiered January 4, 2011.  It was followed by a second season of 10 episodes before cancellation by CBC on April 19, 2012 due to budget cuts from the 2012 Canadian federal budget.

One of the producers called it "the 24 of Canada"; one writer described it as "24 without Jack Bauer; CSI minus the science; and James Bond - if James Bond were Mr. Bean."

The initial pilot focused on the tedium involved in electronic eavesdropping but the decision was made that it would be too "niche". A second pilot was done with a more 24 approach.

Overview
The series revolves around a team of incompetent spy-catchers who work for the Canadian National Intelligence and Security Agency (NISA), a fictional intelligence gathering agency.
Natalie Lisinska as Alex Cranston, the leader of the team
William deVry as Peter McNeil, the director of NISA.
Richard Yearwood as Benjamin N’udu, a loyal and slightly deranged former agent of the fictional Ligerian Secret Service.
Rémy Girard as Claude Lesage, a veteran French Canadian NISA agent.
Matthew MacFadzean as Burt Wilson, an incompetent NISA agent that's always getting himself and others into trouble.
Grace Lynn Kung as Jojo Kwan, a brilliant scientist and NISA agent.
 Ali Kazmi as Nigel

Episodes

Pilot (2010)

Season 1 (2011)

Season 2 (2011)

Reception
The CBC Television premiere episode was viewed by approximately 724,000 people.

On February 11, 2011, CBC announced that the show was renewed for a second season.

Awards and nominations

Home release
'InSecurity: The Complete First Season' is on DVD in region 0. It was released on November 8, 2011.

References

External links

 Official website at CBC.ca
 Verité Films InSecurity official website
 
 

2011 Canadian television series debuts
CBC Television original programming
Espionage television series
Television shows filmed in Regina, Saskatchewan
Television series by Entertainment One
2012 Canadian television series endings
Canadian political comedy television series
2010s Canadian sitcoms
Television shows set in Ottawa
2010s Canadian workplace comedy television series
Canadian action comedy television series
2010s Canadian comedy-drama television series